Ocean Eyes may refer to:

 Ocean Eyes (album), a 2009 album by Owl City
 "Ocean Eyes" (song), a 2016 song by Billie Eilish